Pennant may refer to:

Flag or banner 
 Pennon (or pennant), a narrow, tapering flag
 Commissioning pennant, the traditional sign of a warship, flown from its masthead while the ship is in commission
 Broad pennant, flown from the masthead of a British Royal Navy ship to indicate the presence of a commodore on board
 Pennant (church), flown by navies during services on board ships
 Pennant number, a number used to identify ships by the British Royal Navy and other navies of Europe and the Commonwealth
 Pennant (sports), a commemorative flag displayed or flown by a league-winning team
 Pennant race, the race to clinch the division title in a regular baseball season
 Pennant, a reference to Flag and pennant patterns in technical analysis of a stock market chart

Places 
 Pennant, Ceredigion, Wales
 Pennant, Powys, Wales
 Pennant, Saskatchewan, Canada
 Pennant Point, Nova Scotia, Canada
 Pennant Hills, New South Wales, Australia

People 
 Dafydd Pennant (16th century), Welsh poet
 Edward Douglas-Pennant (disambiguation)
 George Hay Dawkins-Pennant (1764–1840), plantation and slave owner
 George Douglas-Pennant, 2nd Baron Penrhyn
 Richard Pennant, 1st Baron Penrhyn (1737–1808), British politician and owner of sugar plantations in Jamaica
 Thomas Pennant (1726–1798), Welsh writer, naturalist and antiquarian
 Pennant Roberts (1940–2010), British television director and producer

Other 
 Pennant, the common name of the dragonfly genus Celithemis
 Pennant (automobile) (1924–25), manufactured by the Barley Motor Car Co. in Kalamazoo, Michigan, US
 The Pennant, a newspaper in Penola, South Australia
 Vympel, Russian for "Pennant", a Spetznas unit specialised in infiltration and assassination
 Pennant Measures, a stratigraphic division of the South Wales Coal Measures and including the Pennant Sandstone
 Pennant station, a light rail station in Pittsburgh, Pennsylvania, United States